Wallace Stuart Finlayson (15 August 1911 in Winnipeg, Manitoba, Canada – 8 August 1990 Coldwaltham, West Sussex, England), known as Wallace Douglas, was a Canadian producer, director and actor.

The son of Robert Barnett Finlayson and Emiline Marcia Bird, his brother, actor Robert Douglas Finlayson, also used the stage name Douglas.

He married four times, to Pamela Frost, Anne Crawford, Phillippa Avril Kennedy and Peggy Chester.

Selected filmography
 The Love Wager (1933)
 Music Hath Charms (1935)
 Mother, Don't Rush Me (1936)
 The Last Adventurers (1937)
 The Chinese Bungalow (1940)
 Spies of the Air (1940)

References

1911 births
1990 deaths
Canadian male film actors
Male actors from Winnipeg
20th-century Canadian male actors
People from Coldwaltham